Shirabad (Romanized as Shīrābād) is a village in Haviq Rural District, Haviq District, Talesh County, Gilan Province, Iran. In the 2006 census, its population was 672, in 169 families.  It is known for its rice and kiwifruit. Kiwifruit was introduced by Bahman Jalili and for his dedicated hard work observed the certified reward from Iranian government's Department of Agriculture.

References 

Populated places in Talesh County